Pennask Summit (el. 1728 m, 5669 ft) is a highway summit along the Okanagan Connector in British Columbia, Canada, crossing the forested uplands of the Thompson Plateau. It is the highest point on the highway between the cities of Merritt and Peachland. It is the second highest mountain route used by a highway in British Columbia, after Kootenay Pass. It is located 49 km (30 mi) east of Aspen Grove, and 33 km (21 mi) west of the highway junction in Peachland/Westbank.

The road grades to this summit are very steep and are very long - especially when travelling westbound, exiting the Okanagan Valley.

History
The pass is named after the nearby Pennask Creek, and was first used in 1991, upon completion of this freeway.

References

External links
 Grade profile of Highway 97C, including Pennask Summit.

Mountain passes of British Columbia
Okanagan
Nicola Country